Prokom Software SA was one of the largest Polish I.T. companies. The company was listed in the index WIG20.

It was founded in 1987 at the end of communist rule in Poland by Ryszard Krauze. It has built up its position mainly due to many lucrative state contracts. In 2008 Prokom became a part of the Asseco capital group.

References

Information technology companies of Poland
Companies formerly listed on the Warsaw Stock Exchange